The Lindisfarne Football Club, nicknamed the Two Blues, is an Australian rules football club currently playing in the Southern Football League in Tasmania, Australia.

Origins
The Lindisfarne Football Club was formed in 1911 and competed in the Clarence Football Association until 1925 where they won one premiership title in 1924.
In 1926 the club joined Tasmanian Football Association until 1948
In 1949 the club joined the Tasmanian Amateur Football League - Southern Division (Southern Amateurs) winning three premiership titles in 1957, 1982 and its most recent premiership title in 1989 until the League went out of existence at the end of the 1995 season.  
In 1996 they joined the newly formed Southern Tasmanian Football League now known as the SFL where it still competes today.  
After a solid start to its SFL tenure, the Two Blues suffered from a disastrous period between 1998 and 2004 whereby the club lost 74 consecutive senior matches. 
In 2008, Lindisfarne enjoyed a much needed reverse in fortunes by going through the season sweeping all before them, undefeated, only to go down to Huonville Lions by 37-points in the Grand Final. 
This loss heralded an era of frustration and heartbreak for the Two-Blues who went on to perform strongly over the next decade only to suffer similar defeats in Grand Finals, their three most recent losses in Grand Finals (2012, 2016 and 2017) realised losses of 5,8 and 5 points, marking five Grand Final defeats in ten years. Finally in 2018, Lindisfarne won the premiership by avenging their upset 2008 loss against Huonville.

Entry to Southern Football League 
1996

STFL/Regional League/SFL Premierships 
2018, 2019, 2022

STFL/Regional League/SFL Runner Up 
2008, 2009, 2012, 2016, 2017

TAFL Southern Division Premierships 
1957, 1982, 1989

TAFL Southern Division Runners Up 
1992

State Amateur Premierships (Condor Shield) 
1957, 1989

Clarence Football Association Premierships 
1924

TANFL/TFL Statewide League/TSFL Premierships
 Nil

Peter Hodgman Medal winners 
1997 – Tim Blanden

William Leitch Medal winners 
2016 – Troy Cunliffe 
2017 – Troy Cunliffe 
2022 – Josh Green

STFL/Regional League/SFL Leading Goalkickers 
1997 – Darren Kaye (101) 
2006 – Jamie Tubb (77) 
2017 – Michael Cassidy (72) 
2022 – Josh Green (97) 

Club Record Games-Holder 
360 by Luke Spink

Club Record Attendance 
4,956 vs New Norfolk – 2012 SFL Grand Final at KGV Oval

Club Record Score 
Not Recorded

External links
 Official website

Australian rules football clubs in Tasmania
1911 establishments in Australia
Australian rules football clubs established in 1911
Sport in Hobart
City of Clarence